The Danish Superliga is the current Danish football championship tournament, and administered by the Danish Football Association. It is the highest football league in Denmark and is currently contested by 12 teams each year, with two teams relegated.

History
Founded in 1991, the Danish Superliga replaced the Danish 1st Division as the highest league of football in Denmark. From the start in 1991, 10 teams were participating. The opening Superliga season was played during the spring of 1991, with the ten teams playing each other twice for the championship title. From the summer of 1991, the tournament structure would stretch over two calendar years. The 10 teams would play each other twice in the first half of the tournament. In the following spring, the bottom two teams would be cut off, the points of the teams would be cut in half, and the remaining eight teams would once more play each other twice, for a total of 32 games in a season.

This practice was abandoned before the 1995–96 season, when the number of teams competing was increased to 12, playing each other thrice for 33 games per Superliga season. For the first season of this new structure, Coca-Cola became the name sponsor of the league, which was then named Coca-Cola Ligaen. After a single season under that name, Faxe Brewery became sponsors and the league changed its name to Faxe Kondi Ligaen. Before the 2001–02 season, Scandinavian Airlines System (SAS) became the head sponsor, and the name of the tournament changed to SAS Ligaen. From January 2015 the Danish Superliga is known as Alka Superliga, as the Danish insurance company Alka became name sponsor.

Logos used for naming rights agreements for the league:

Structure
From 1996 through 2016, the league included 12 clubs which played each other three times. The two teams with the fewest points at the end of the season were relegated to the Danish 1st Division and replaced by the top two teams of that division. During this era, each team played every other team at least once at home and once away plus once more either at home or away. The top six teams of the previous season played 17 matches at home and 16 away while the teams in 7th to 10th place plus the two newly promoted teams played 16 matches at home and 17 away.

Following the 2015–16 season, the league was expanded to 14 teams, accomplished by relegating only the last-place finisher in that season and promoting the top three teams from the 1st division. The 2016–17 season was the first for the new league structure. It began with the teams playing a full home-and-away schedule, resulting in 26 matches for each team. At that time, the league split into a six-team championship playoff and an eight-team qualifying playoff. All teams' table points and goals carry over fully into the playoffs.

In the championship playoff, each team plays the others home and away again. The top team at the end of the playoff is Superliga champion and enters the Champions League in the second qualifying round. The second-place team enters the Europa League in the first qualifying round. The third-place team advances to a one-off playoff match for another Europa League place. If the winner of the Danish Cup finishes in the top three, the match will instead involve the fourth-place team.

The qualifying playoff is split into two groups, with the teams that finished the regular season in 7th, 10th, 11th, and 14th in one group and those finishing 8th, 9th, 12th, and 13th in the other. Each group plays home-and-away within its group. The top two teams from each group then enter a knockout tournament, with each match over two legs. If the Danish Cup winner is among the top two finishers in either playoff group, it is withdrawn from the knockout playoff and its opponent automatically advances to the tournament final. The winner of that tournament faces the third-place (or fourth-place) team from the championship playoff in a one-off match, with the winner entering the Europa League in the first qualifying round.

The bottom two teams from each group then contest a relegation playoff with several steps, centered on a separate four-team knockout playoff, also consisting totally of two-legged matches:
 The third-placed teams in each group play over two legs, with the winners remaining in the Superliga and the losers advancing to a playoff final against the third-place team from the 1st Division.
 The bottom teams in each group play over two legs, with the winners advancing to a play-off final against the second-place team from the 1st Division, and the losers dropping to next season's 1st Division.
 The winners of each play-off final play in the next season's Superliga.

In the 2019–20 season, the number of teams was reduced from 14 to 12 teams. It began with all 12 teams playing a full home-and-away schedule, resulting in 22 matches for each team. At that time, the league split into a six-team championship playoff and a six-team qualifying playoff. All teams' points and goals carried over fully from the regular season into the playoffs. In both playoff groups, six teams play a full home-and-away schedule, resulting in ten matches (32 for the full season). The two bottom teams in the qualifying playoff are relegated to 1st Division, while the team finishing 7th plays against the lowest placed team from the Championship playoff, who failed to qualify directly to European Football, in a single match, to decide the final European spot from Denmark.

Teams

Current teams (2022–23)

Winners

Seasons

Relegations

Notable players

Top goalscorers

All-Time topscorer(s) 
The 10 most scoring players throughout the history of the Superliga. Latest update 30 December 2022.
{| class="wikitable sortable" style="text-align:center;"
! Rank
! Topscorer(s)
! Goals
! Club(s)
|-
| 1. || Morten "Duncan" Rasmussen || 145 || AGF, Brøndby IF, AaB, FC Midtjylland
|-
| 2. || Søren Frederiksen || 139 || Silkeborg IF, Viborg FF, AaB 
|-
| 3. || Peter Møller || 135 || AaB, Brøndby IF, FC København
|-
| 4. || Heine Fernandez || 126 || AB, FC København, Silkeborg IF, Viborg FF
|-
| 5. || Steffen Højer || 124|| OB, Viborg FF, AaB
|-
| 6. || Frank Kristensen || 109 || FC Midtjylland, Ikast fS, Randers FC
|-
| 7. || Peter Graulund || 107 || AGF, Brøndby IF, Vejle BK
|-
| 8. || Søren Andersen || 101 || AGF, OB, AaB
|-
| 9. || Nicklas Helenius || 93 || AaB, Silkeborg IF, OB, AGF
|-
| 10. || Dame N'Doye || 90 || FC København
|}

Most capped players

Most capped foreign players

Attendances

See also
 List of Danish Superliga clubs
 Sports league attendances

Notes

External links

  
 Guide to the Danish Superliga (in english)

 

 
1
Denmark
Professional sports leagues in Denmark